Sahil Sharma (born 9 November 1989) is an Indian cricketer. He made his first-class debut for Jammu and Kashmir in the 2012–13 Ranji Trophy on 24 November 2012.

References

External links
 

1989 births
Living people
Indian cricketers
Jammu and Kashmir cricketers
People from Jammu